Conor David Coady (born 25 February 1993) is an English professional footballer who plays as a centre-back for Everton, on loan from fellow  club  Wolverhampton Wanderers, and the England national team.

Coady came through the academy system at Liverpool and made two appearances for the first team before spending a season on loan at Sheffield United and then moving to Huddersfield Town on a permanent transfer in 2014. A year later he signed for Wolverhampton Wanderers for £2 million and has played over 300 games for the club, winning the Championship in the 2017–18 season.

Coady represented England at youth level, being named in the team of the tournament as England won the 2010 UEFA European Under-17 Championship and captaining the England under-20 team at the 2013 FIFA U-20 World Cup. He made his debut for the senior team in 2020 and was part of the squad that came runners-up at UEFA Euro 2020.

Early life
Coady was born in St Helens, Merseyside, and grew up in nearby Haydock. He is of Irish descent through a grandparent. He attended Bleak Hill Primary School, Windle and Rainford High Technology College. He grew up supporting Liverpool F.C.

Club career

Liverpool
Coady is a product of the Liverpool Youth Academy after joining the club in 2005. During the 2010–11 season, Coady was on the fringes of the first team, making the substitutes' bench twice but failed to make a first-team appearance. Coady played every Reserve League and NextGen Series match during the 2011–12 season, scoring five goals. Despite being named in the senior squad list and being called up to the senior squad occasionally from 2009, he did not make his senior debut until 8 November 2012 in a UEFA Europa League group stage match against Anzhi Makhachkala. After Andre Wisdom's promotion as a full-time senior squad member, Conor Coady was installed as full-time captain of the Under-21 squad and on 12 May 2013 he made his Premier League debut in a 3–1 win at Fulham.

Coady agreed a six-month loan with League One club Sheffield United on 22 July 2013, later stating that he had turned down the chance to go on Liverpool's pre-season tour of Australia and the Far East in order to join up with his new club. Coady made his debut for the Blades in the opening fixture of the following season, coming on as a second-half substitute in a 2–1 home victory over Notts County, and made his first start for the club in the following game, a League Cup first round defeat to League Two club Burton Albion.

Coady scored his first senior goal in a 1–1 draw at Leyton Orient on 30 November 2013. Having been in and out of the team during the first half of the season, Coady began to cement a regular first-team place over the Christmas period, prompting United to extend his loan spell during the January transfer window, and once more in February to extend his stay until the end of the season. Coady played regularly for the Blades for the remainder of the season including playing on the losing side in the 5-3 loss to Hull City in the FA Cup semi-final  and returned to Anfield having played 50 games and scored 6 goals.

Huddersfield Town
On 6 August 2014, Coady signed for Championship club Huddersfield Town on a three-year contract for a fee believed to be around £500,000. He made his debut as a substitute in the 4–0 defeat by AFC Bournemouth on 9 August. On 1 October, he scored his first goal for the club against Wolverhampton Wanderers where Town won 3–1 at Molineux Stadium. He again found the net, this time in a 2–2 draw against Rotherham United.

Wolverhampton Wanderers

On 3 July 2015, Coady signed for Championship club Wolverhampton Wanderers on a three-year contract for an undisclosed fee, believed to be around £2 million. He scored his first goal for Wolves in a 2–1 EFL Cup first round win against Crawley Town on 9 August 2016.

Under new head coach Nuno Espírito Santo, Coady moved to the centre of a three-man defence for Wolves from the 2017–18 season onward, where he spent much of the season as club captain, and has been full-time captain since the club's return to the Premier League from the 2018–19 season. In September 2017 he signed a new four-year contract. On 21 April 2018, during his 120th league appearance for Wolves, he scored a 66th-minute penalty in a 4–0 win against Bolton Wanderers to record his first league goal for the club, as Wolves sealed the Championship title.

On 15 February 2019, Coady signed a new contract lasting to June 2023. He was an ever-present player for Wolves in both the 2018–19 and 2019–20 Premier League seasons, in which they finished 7th in both cases. He also played every minute of Wolves' Europa League campaign in 2019–20 as they reached the quarter-finals. At the end of the competition, he was named in UEFA's Squad of the Season.

On 30 September 2020, three weeks after Coady won his first full England cap, he signed a new five-year deal with the club, keeping him at Wolves until 2025. In late November, he missed the game against Southampton as he had been in contact with a person diagnosed with COVID-19; this broke an 84-game streak of playing every minute (7,560 in total), third-best for outfield players in the history of the Premier League. 

On 2 March 2021, Coady scored his first-ever Premier League goal, a header, in a 1–4 away defeat to Manchester City. His first home goal in the league was the following 15 January, on his 298th appearance for the club, in a 3–1 victory over Southampton. On 5 February 2022, he made his 300th competitive appearance for Wolves against Norwich City at home in the 4th round of the FA Cup. He scored the only goal on 13 March in a win at Everton that constituted Wolves's 1,000th win in top-flight football (over 67 seasons dating back to 1888) and also sealed their first league double over that opponent since 1972–73.

Loan to Everton
On 8 August 2022, Coady signed for Premier League club Everton on a season-long loan with an option to buy. He made his debut five days later in a 2–1 loss at Aston Villa, leaving the game with a late injury. On 3 September, he put the ball in the net in the Merseyside derby against his childhood team Liverpool, but it was ruled offside in a goalless draw. On 1 October 2022, Coady scored his first goal for Everton in a 2-1 away win against Southampton.

International career
Coady has represented England from under-16 to under-20 youth levels. He has been capped 17 times for the England national under-17 football team. He played and captained the England team at the 2010 UEFA European Under-17 Championship in Liechtenstein where he and his England colleagues won the tournament, and became the first England team to win an international tournament in 17 years. He was then part of the 2012 UEFA European Under-19 Championship in Estonia in which England got as far as the semi-finals where they were knocked out by Greece. He was named captain of the England under-20 team by manager Peter Taylor for the 2013 FIFA U-20 World Cup. He made his debut for the team on 16 June, in a 3–0 win in a warm-up game against Uruguay. On 23 June, he scored in the opening group-stage game against Iraq.

In August 2020 Coady was called up to the England senior squad by Gareth Southgate for the Nations League matches against Iceland and Denmark, starting in central defence against the latter on 8 September in a 0–0 draw, and in doing so becoming the first Wolves player to start for England since Steve Bull in 1990. Coady was awarded man of the match by Sky Sports. On 8 October 2020, Coady scored his first goal for England in his second appearance, a 3–0 friendly win against Wales at Wembley.

Coady was in the England squad that came runners-up at UEFA Euro 2020, held in 2021. Though he did not play any games, he was dubbed England's "player of the tournament" by assistant manager Steve Holland, who believed that his presence in the team's camp was similar to that of John Terry when he played less often in his final years at Chelsea.

Personal life
In November 2021, Coady was named Football Ally of the Year at the British LGBT Awards for his outspoken support for gay footballers. Coady said that "Equality is a massive word, and when it comes to LGBTQ stuff, I'm big on making people feel involved." Coady concluded that in his team "[criticising a player based on their sexuality] would never be the case within [our] dressing room."

Career statistics

Club

International

England score listed first, score column indicates score after each Coady goal

Honours
Wolverhampton Wanderers
EFL Championship: 2017–18

England U17
UEFA European Under-17 Championship: 2010

England
UEFA European Championship runner-up: 2020

Individual
UEFA European Under-17 Championship Team of the Tournament: 2010
EFL Championship Team of the Season: 2017–18
EFL Team of the Season: 2017–18
UEFA Europa League Squad of the Season: 2019–20

References

External links

Profile at the Everton F.C. website
Profile at the Wolverhampton Wanderers F.C. website
Profile at the Football Association website

1993 births
Living people
Footballers from St Helens, Merseyside
People from Haydock
English footballers
Association football defenders
Liverpool F.C. players
Sheffield United F.C. players
Huddersfield Town A.F.C. players
Wolverhampton Wanderers F.C. players
Everton F.C. players
Premier League players
English Football League players
England youth international footballers
England international footballers
UEFA Euro 2020 players
2022 FIFA World Cup players
English people of Irish descent